Anacrusis stapiana is a species of moth of the family Tortricidae. It is found in Costa Rica, Panama and Brazil.

The larvae have been recorded feeding on Cedrella odorata.

References

Moths described in 1875
Atteriini
Moths of South America
Moths of Central America